Zoran Janjetov (born 23 June 1961) is a Serbian comics artist. Janjetov is among most prominent comics creators of former Yugoslavia, published worldwide. He is best known as the illustrator of Avant l'Incal and The Technopriests, written by Alejandro Jodorowsky.

During the mid-1980s, Janjetov was a vocalist for the Yugoslav art rock band Heroina, with which he recorded one album.

Biography

Early biography
Janjetov started to draw at very early age with strong support from his parents. His father, an architect by profession, gave him the knowledge needed to start his career. Young Janjetov was influenced by the works of Walt Disney, and had already made his first short comic at age seven.

After finishing high school, he continued his education at the Academy of Arts in Novi Sad, where he graduated.

Career in comics

From 1981 to 1995, Janjetov worked on the Bernard Panasonik, published in magazines Yu strip magazin and Vreme zabave.

In 1986, Janjetov was chosen by Alejandro Jodorowski to finish the colour art in The Incal.

Musical career and cover design
In 1983, Janjetov became a vocalist for the art rock band Heroina. With the band he recorded one self-titled album, produced by Mitar Subotić and released in 1985.

Janjetov designed the album artwork for Heroina along with artwork for a number of other Yugoslav acts, including Oktobar 1864, Viktorija, Angel's Breath, but also for international world music acts, like Zuco 103, Konono Nº1, Bebel Gilberto, Celso Fonseca, Tartit, Taraf de Haïdouks, Mahala Raï Banda, Kasai Allstars, Kočani Orkestar and other acts.

Bibliography
 Bernard Panasonik, series (1981-1995) Yu strip magazin and Vreme zabave; collected in album (2003), System Comics, Serbia
 Avant l'Incal, written by Alexandro Jodorowsky, Les Humanoïdes Associés, France
 Les Deux Orphelins (1988), republished under the title Adieu le père (2002)
 Détective privé de classe “R” (1990)
 Croot (1991)
 Anarco-psychotiques (1992)
 Ouisky, SPV et homéoputes (1993)
 Suicide Allée' (1995)Les Technopères written by Alexandro Jodorowsky, colored by Fred Beltran, Les Humanoïdes Associés, France
 La Pré-école techno (1998)
 L’École pénitentiaire de Nohope (1999)
 Planeta Games (2000)
 Halkattraz, l’étoile des bourreaux (2002)
 La Secte des Techno-évêques (2003)
 Les Secrets du Techno-Vatican (2004)
 Le Jeu parfait (2005)
 La Galaxie promise (2006)Les armes du Méta-Baron : Vol. 1 (2004), written by Alexandro Jodorowsky, co-drawn with Travis Charest, Les Humanoïdes Associés, FranceEl Gladiator contre Mango (2010), written by Jerry Frissen, drawn by 38 artists, Les Humanoïdes Associés, France
 L'Ogregod, written by Alexandro Jodorowsky, Delcourt, France
 Les Naufragés (2010)
 Sans futur (2012)

Discography

With HeroinaHeroina (1985)

References

External links
 Interview with Zoran Janjetov, by Christophe Labussière, Premonition Magazine'' 
 International bibliography at Comic books database (partial) 
 Zoran Janjetov bio-bibliography at Les Humanoïdes Associés, official page of the publisher 
 Comics Culture in Yugoslavia: World-Class Innovators & Remarkable Visionaries by Paul Gravett

1961 births
Living people
Serbian comics artists
Serbian comics writers
Serbian illustrators
Album-cover and concert-poster artists
Serbian rock singers
Yugoslav rock singers
Artists from Subotica
Musicians from Subotica